Richard Martín Lugo Martínez (born 20 June 1992) is a Paraguayan footballer who plays for Serie D club Fidelis Andria as a winger.

Club career
After playing youth football with Udinese, Lugo moved to Colón de Santa Fe in the 2010 summer. After  seasons in Argentina, he returned to his homeland, joining Independiente de Campo Grande.

After one season with the side Lugo moved to fellow second-divisioner Sportivo Carapeguá. He was an important midfield unit during his six-month spell, netting three goals in 23 appearances.

On 7 September 2013 Lugo moved to Italian Serie B side Bari. A day later he made his division debut, starting in a 2–3 loss at Siena.

On 18 December 2018 he was released from his Virtus Francavilla contract by mutual consent. In 2019, he returned home to Paraguay and played for Club Nacional. However, in December 2019, Lugo moved to Italy again and signed with Serie D club Fidelis Andria.

References

External links

Goal.com profile

1992 births
Living people
Association football wingers
Paraguayan footballers
Paraguayan expatriate footballers
Serie B players
Serie C players
Paraguayan Primera División players
Independiente F.B.C. footballers
F.C. Grosseto S.S.D. players
Club Guaraní players
Sportivo Carapeguá footballers
S.S.C. Bari players
General Díaz footballers
Club Nacional footballers
Virtus Francavilla Calcio players
A.S. Bisceglie Calcio 1913 players
Paraguayan expatriate sportspeople in Italy
Expatriate footballers in Italy
Paraguayan expatriate sportspeople in Argentina
Expatriate footballers in Argentina